Ruffré-Mendola (Rufré-Méndola in local dialect) is a comune (municipality) in Trentino in the northern Italian region Trentino-Alto Adige/Südtirol, located about  north of Trento.

It borders the following municipalities: Sarnonico, Caldaro and Cavareno.

Demographic evolution

References

External links
 Homepage of the city

Cities and towns in Trentino-Alto Adige/Südtirol
Nonsberg Group